The Roberts-Banner Building is a historic building in El Paso, Texas. Old adobe houses were demolished to make room for the construction of this five-story building in 1910. It was built with concrete, and designed by Trost & Trost. It has been listed on the National Register of Historic Places since September 24, 1980.

References

Buildings and structures completed in 1910
Buildings and structures in El Paso, Texas
National Register of Historic Places in El Paso County, Texas
Trost & Trost buildings